Tenure of Office Act may refer to:
Tenure of Office Act (1820)
Tenure of Office Act (1867)